Free Wood Post was a News Satire website that has ceased to operate. It was an online satirical take on current affairs featuring fake stories about politics, pop culture, and the marketplace. The website has been featured and debunked by several sources including; Snopes.com, Forbes.com, UrbanLegends.about.com, as well as several others.

History
Free Wood Post began in September 2011.

Press
Free Wood Post as well as the site Editor-in-Chief, Sarah Wood have been featured in an interview for BreakThru Radio.com  discussing the birth of the site and why it is an important feature to the political world.

See also
 List of satirical magazines
 List of satirical news websites
 List of satirical television news programs

References

External links
 Free Wood Post

American satirical websites
Internet properties established in 2011